Pierino Gaspard (born ) is an Italian wheelchair curler and alpine skier.

As wheelchair curler he participated in the 2006 Winter Paralympics where Italian team finished on seventh place.

As alpine skier he participated in the 1992 and 1994 Winter Paralympics.

Wheelchair curling teams

Alpine skiing results

References

External links 

Living people
1954 births
Italian male curlers
Italian wheelchair curlers
Italian disabled sportspeople
Paralympic wheelchair curlers of Italy
Wheelchair curlers at the 2006 Winter Paralympics
Paralympic alpine skiers of Italy
Alpine skiers at the 1992 Winter Paralympics
Alpine skiers at the 1994 Winter Paralympics
20th-century Italian people